The Men's Team Pursuit was one of the 6 men's events at the 2010 European Track Championships, held in Pruszków, Poland.

Twelve teams of 4 cyclists each participated in the contest. After the qualifying, the fastest 2 teams raced for gold, and 3rd and 4th teams raced for bronze.

The Qualifying and the Finals were held on November 5.

World record

Qualifying
Fastest 2 teams race for gold and 3rd and 4th teams race for bronze.

Finals

References

Qualifying Results
Final Results

Men's Team Pursuit
European Track Championships – Men's team pursuit